An affinity mask is a bit mask indicating what processor(s) a thread or process should be run on by the scheduler of an operating system. Setting the affinity mask for certain processes running under Windows can be useful as there are several system processes (especially on domain controllers) that are restricted to the first CPU / Core. So, excluding the first CPU might lead to better application performance.

Windows API 
Thread affinity in Microsoft Windows can be specified with the SetThreadAffinityMask function. Forcing of each OpenMP thread to distinctive cores in Windows can be accomplished by means of the following C code:
 #include <windows.h>
 #include <omp.h>
 // Set OpenMP thread affinity
 void set_thread_affinity () {
     #pragma omp parallel default(shared)
     {
         DWORD_PTR mask = (DWORD_PTR )1 << omp_get_thread_num();
         SetThreadAffinityMask(GetCurrentThread(), mask);
     }
 }

See also 
 Processor affinity

References

External links 
MSDN article on SetThreadAffinityMask function
Taskset, a tool to set the affinity mask on Linux
CPU Balancer, a free, open-source utility that distributes Windows XP processes uniformly over logical processors using the affinity mask

Job scheduling